Komarówka Podlaska  is a village in Radzyń Podlaski County, Lublin Voivodeship, in eastern Poland. It is the seat of the gmina (administrative district) called Gmina Komarówka Podlaska.

The village has a population of 1,300.

Notable residents
Dariusz Kowaluk (born 1996), sprinter, Olympic medallist

References

Villages in Radzyń Podlaski County